The following is a list of Islamist terrorist attacks.

1940s

1970s

1980s

1990s

2001-2010

2001

2002

2003

2004

2005

2006

2007

2008

2009

2010

2011-2020

2011

2012

2013

2014

2015

2016

2017

2018

2019

2020

2021-2030

2021

2022

2023

See also 
 List of right-wing terrorist attacks
 List of terrorist incidents
 List of terrorist incidents linked to the Islamic State
 List of thwarted Islamic terrorist attacks
 Terrorism in Europe

References

External links
U.S. Government:
 US State Department Country Reports on Terrorism
 Significant Terrorist Incidents, 1961–2003: A Brief Chronology
 Appendix A Chronology of Significant International Terrorist Incidents, 2003 (Revised 6/22/04)
 Significant Attacks Against U.S. Diplomatic Facilities and Personnel 1998–2012
 List of Major Terrorism Cases from the FBI

News:
 Al Qaida timeline plots and attacks 1992–2005
 Terror strikes blamed on Al zarqawi 1992–2005
 Timeline of Terror Attacks in Past 20 Years 1995–2015

Books with lists:
 Global Terrorism By Leonard Weinberg page 174
 Encyclopedia of Terrorist, Natural, and Man-Made Disasters by Michael I. Greenberg
 Disaster! A Compendium of Terrorist, Natural, and Man-Made Catastrophes By Michael I. Greenberg

Books with additional resources:
 The Routledge Handbook of Terrorism Research

Web sites/pages:
 "A History of Terror..." (prior to September 11)
 Terrorist attacks and related incidents in the United States

Islamist terrorist attacks
Terrorism-related lists
Islamist terrorist attacks
War on terror